Reza Azari (born 10 February 1998) is an Iranian football midfielder, who most recently played for Saipa in Azadegan League.

Club career

Esteghlal
On 12 June 2018, he signed a five-year contract with Esteghlal. He made his debut for Esteghlal Tehran on 27 July 2018 against Paykan as a substitute for Ali Karimi.

Honours

Esteghlal 
Iran Pro League: 2021–22
Hazfi Cup runner-up: 2019–20

References

1998 births
Living people
Esteghlal F.C. players
Machine Sazi F.C. players
Saipa F.C. players
Iranian footballers
Association football midfielders
People from Ardabil